Eucosmomorpha multicolor is a moth of the family Tortricidae. It is found in the Russian Far East (including Primorsky Krai, Amur, Maritime Territory), the Korean Peninsula and Japan.

Its habitat consists of lowland broad-leaved forests.

External links
 Lepidopterous fauna of the USSR and adjacent countries
 Japanese Moths
 Korean Insects

Olethreutinae
Moths of Asia
Moths described in 1964
Moths of Japan